The Marquette Tribune is the official student newspaper of Marquette University in Milwaukee, Wisconsin.

It has consistently won awards, including Best Non-Daily Student Newspaper by the Society of Professional Journalists.

External links
 Marquette Tribune Website

Marquette University
Student newspapers published in Wisconsin
Publications with year of establishment missing